The 1956 United States presidential election in Virginia took place on November 6, 1956. Voters chose 12 representatives, or electors to the Electoral College, who voted for president and vice president.

Virginia voted for the Republican nominee, incumbent President Dwight Eisenhower, over the Democratic nominee, former Illinois Governor Adlai Stevenson and former Commissioner of Internal Revenue T. Coleman Andrews, who received the nomination of the States' Rights Party. Andrews had his strongest showing in his home state of Virginia. Eisenhower ultimately won the national election with 57.37% of the vote.  This election marks the most recent time Virginia voted to the left of Maryland (by margin of victory).

, this is the last election when majority-black Charles City County has voted for a Republican presidential candidate.

Results

Results by county

Notes

References

Virgin
1956
1956 Virginia elections